Split Mountain (or similar) is the name of one of 17 peaks in the United States:

There is also a Split Mountain in Canada:
 Split Mountain (British Columbia)